Xavier High School was a private all-boys college preparatory Catholic high school in Concord, Massachusetts which operated from 1962 to 1971.

History
The school was located at the Concord Turnpike section of Massachusetts Route 2 in Concord, near the corner of Route 2 and Massachusetts Route 62 and was built at a cost of $3 million. The building was a 3-story building with 35 classrooms and while the school was able to accommodate up to 1,200 students. it never reached capacity. The total enrollment for the 1965–1966 school year, for example, was 401. The first graduating class in 1966, who attended Xavier High School for all four years, consisted of 87 graduates. The final graduating class before the school's closure in 1971 consisted of 91 graduates.

The all-boys school had required entrance exams for incoming freshmen.

The auditorium had a seating capscity of 1,300, making it the largest space for indoor gatherings in the city of Concord at the time. Because of this, the school's auditorium was used for non-school activities, especially when the smaller Concord High School auditorium was insufficient. These programs included adult education lectures and group psychotherapy sessions,  ecumenical services, Pi Lambda Theta conferences, science congresses, concerts, and orchestra events.

Closure
The Jesuit priests who ran the school made a decision in 1970 to close the school the following year in 1971, blaming a decline in enrollment, rising costs and a shortage of religious teachers. The headmaster, Rev. John R Vigneau, said there had been "a gnawing doubt which over the years became a conviction that we are not fulfilling service for the greater good of God's people at Xavier."

The closure reflected a shifting viewpoint and re-evaluation in the Jesuit order concerning the best way to teach the highest number of people in the most effective way. The headmaster Rev. Vigneau said "we do not reject you but we sincerely have tried to raise the basic question of whether we can serve God best here or elsewhere and the answer for some of us...whispers back that there are other more demanding needs."

After closing
The Concord-Carlisle Regional School District briefly considered purchasing the school for use as a school within their own school system, but ultimately rejected this idea as it would have required expensive renovation because the building itself did not meet the school district's educational specifications.

Instead the plot of land was rezoned for commercial use and sold to the Minuteman Companies, an insurance company whose headquarters had been in Concord since the mid-1800s.

The town briefly used the school's large auditorium for town meetings after the school closed in 1971 and continued using it after it was purchased by the Minutemen Companies.

Extracurricular activities
Xavier High School had sports programs including basketball as well as a theatre program and community outreach volunteer work.

The school participated in a series of debate tournaments between Catholic High Schools organized by the Catholic Youth Organization, and students also were involved in overseas trips to locations including France, England, and Germany.

Notable alumni
Ethan Anthony, American architect, author, and academic

References

1962 disestablishments in Massachusetts
1971 disestablishments in Massachusetts
Buildings and structures in Concord, Massachusetts
Schools in Middlesex County, Massachusetts
Defunct boys' schools in the United States
Defunct schools in Massachusetts